Melrose, also known as Melrose Castle, is a historic home located near Casanova, Fauquier County, Virginia. The house was built between 1856 and 1860, and is a two-story, five bay,"L"-shaped Gothic Revival style dwelling. It features a three-story-octagonal tower in the center bay and castellation along the parapet. The house was enlarged considerably around 1920 through a large addition to the west end for expanded service areas.

It was listed on the National Register of Historic Places in 1983.

History

Built between 1856 and 1860, Melrose was built by Dr. James H. Murray and his brother Edward Murray. They named the castle after Melrose Abbey, a castle in their ancestral home of Scotland. In April 1862, Melrose was occupied by Union soldiers during the American Civil War, and later served as a hospital.

The property was first sold in December 1863 and then changed hands many times. In 2017 the 9,000-square-foot house and 50-acre wooded lot was listed for sale at $2.2 million.

Cultural references

A visit to Melrose Castle inspired mystery writer Mary Roberts Rinehart to write her first bestselling novel, The Circular Staircase (1908).

References

Houses on the National Register of Historic Places in Virginia
Gothic Revival architecture in Virginia
Houses completed in 1860
Houses in Fauquier County, Virginia
National Register of Historic Places in Fauquier County, Virginia